Pakistan competed at the 2004 Summer Paralympics in Athens, Greece. The team included 9 athletes, 8 men and 1 woman, but won no medals.

Sports

Athletics

Men's track

Men's field

Women's track

See also
Pakistan at the Paralympics
Pakistan at the 2004 Summer Olympics

References 

Nations at the 2004 Summer Paralympics
2004
Summer Paralympics